The Bofors 57 mm Naval Automatic Gun L/70 ( (57 mm SAK 70)), among other names, is a series of dual-purpose naval guns designed and produced by the Swedish arms manufacturer AB Bofors (since March 2005 part of BAE Systems AB), designed in the late 1960s as a replacement design for the twin barreled Bofors 57 mm Naval Automatic Gun L/60. The gun is remotely controlled by a fire-control computer but can as a redundancy measure also be operated manually by crew using instrument panels either on or in direct contact with the gun.

The gun has been upgraded and improved several times:
Mk1 – The baseline Mark 1 variant began production in 1970 and was initially used to equip smaller coastal patrol craft and fast attack craft. 
Mk2 – The improved Mark 2 variant came in 1981 and drastically lowered the weight as well as introduced new servo stabilizers. 
Mk3 – The improved Mark 3 variant came in 1995 and primarily features the ability to use programmable ammunition.

While the 57 mm cannon may not seem as powerful as larger naval guns, such as the OTO Melara 76 mm, some of its performances are comparable; given its rate of fire and amount of explosive per shell, the Bofors gun actually achieves a higher amount of "explosive fired per second" than the 76 mm.

Although the Swedish Navy has been the primary user of the gun, it has been exported widely by Bofors Defence for use by the navies of Brunei, Canada, Croatia, Finland, Indonesia, Ireland, Malaysia, Mexico, Montenegro, Singapore, Thailand, and the United States.

Names 
The gun is formally known under a variety of names around the globe. Internally at Bofors (now BAE Systems AB) it usually goes under names incorporating the Bofors term 'SAK', an acronym for 'SjöAutomatKanon', meaning "Sea Automatic Cannon" (literal) or "Naval Automatic Gun" (formal). Some examples being: 57 mm SAK 70 (57 mm sjöautomatkanon L/70) and SAK 57 Mk1, SAK 57 Mk2, SAK 57 Mk3, etc. Not to be confused with the Bofors 57 mm Naval Automatic Gun L/60 which has gone under similar names like 57 mm SAK 60 (57 mm sjöautomatkanon L/60). BAE Systems has also stated on their website that the current generation of the weapon, the mark 3, is simply known as the 57Mk3 internally as of 2011.

Design and development 
The Bofors 40 mm L/60 anti air gun (1.6 inch) was one of the most popular naval anti-aircraft guns during World War II, used long after the war in a variety of roles. However, as jet aircraft became more prevalent in the post-war era, it was clear the gun did not have the rate of fire needed to effectively deal with these threats.

Bofors' engineers considered two solutions to the problem. One was to greatly increase the firing speed of the 40 while also incorporating any minor changes that would improve its range. This produced the 40 mm L/70, which remains popular to this day. The other was to design a larger weapon with much greater effective range and a larger explosive load that offset a lower firing rate. This eventually resulted in the single-barreled Bofors 57 mm Automatic A.A. Gun L/60 and twin-barreled Bofors 57 mm Naval Automatic Gun L/60 in 1950. The 57 mm L/60 systems were however far from ideal; they had a low rate of fire and were very big and heavy, especially the twin-barrel system. Due to the ever improving performance of jet aircraft, a new and improved base design was needed by the late 1960s. The focus of the new design was to increase velocity, range and firing rate. This design became the 57 mm Naval Automatic Gun L/70.

Mark 1 
Fire rate was also higher on the L/70 design: 200 rounds per minute, compared to 130 rounds per minute per barrel  on the 57 mm L/60-design. The Mark 1 gun mount featured a 40-round magazine and a further 128 rounds were stowed inside the Mark 1 turret. Aiming operation was performed by a new electro-hydraulic system for rapid training and elevation.

The 57 mm L/70 Mark 1 was introduced into the Swedish Navy in 1971 as the 57 mm automatpjäs 7101 (57 mm apj 7101) on the Norrköping-class missile boat fast attack craft, also known as the Spica-II-class (not to be confused with the Spica-class torpedo boat (Spica-I)). It featured two ammunition hoists. A second variant designated 57 mm apj 7102 was introduced in 1972 on the HMS Jägaren (V150) patrol boat. It was similar to the 7101 but featured only a single ammunition hoist. Besides Sweden, the Mark 1 also saw adoption with Finland, Malaysia, Norway, Indonesia, Singapore and (the former) Yugoslavia.

Mark 2 
The Mark 2 was an improved variant of the gun designed in 1981. It featured a slightly higher rate of fire of 220 rounds per minute, had a lighter weight, and utilized a new servo drive/servomechanism system which compensates for barrel oscillations during firing, increasing the hit probability. The Mark 2 gun is fitted with a 40-round ready-use gun-magazine with four vertical 10-round compartments. There are also cassettes inside the mounting for 80 more ready to use rounds (120 rounds total in the mounting). Ammunition is hoisted manually into the mounting using two manual-hoists which feeds from the ammunition-room below the mounting. Bofors claims that with 120 ready rounds the system can sufficiently engage 1 to 2 surface targets and 4 sea skimming missiles.

To remove weight from the design, the Mark 2 variant omitted the water-cooling used on the Mark 1. This meant a lighter barrel and gun mount. According to Bofors, water-cooling was not needed for the modern missions the Mark 2 was used for. Bofors even recommended that watercooling be removed from older mountings. The Mark 2 gun barrel was also forged from monobloc steel to help with heat-wear from the lack of water-cooling. The Mark 2 mounting originally also had room for a gun operator, however, the compartment was too narrow for practicality and the wind-shield proved to be a source for radar-reflections, and was quickly replaced by a TV-camera.

The 57 mm L/70 Mark 2 was introduced into the Swedish Navy in 1985 as the 57 mm automatpjäs 7103 (57 mm apj 7103) on the —HSwMS Stockholm (sister ship HSwMS Malmö was built in 1984 but armed with the older Mk1, subsequently retrofitted with the Mk2 in 2009). An improved version designated 57 mm automatpjäs 7103B (57 mm apj 7103B) was introduced in 1990 on the Göteborg-class corvette. Beyond Sweden the Mark 2 also saw adoption by Canada and four other navies. Bofors has manufactured a total of about 25 Bofors 57 mm L/70 Mark 2 guns.

Mark 3 
The latest development of the gun is the Mark 3, designed in 1995 for use on the then planned Visby-class corvette. The Mark 3 system has kept the same rate of fire and ammunition capacity as the previous Mark 2 system but has added a ton of features to make it a modern system. Some of the primary changes includes: the ability to use Bofors 3P all-target programmable ammunition, the addition of a small muzzle velocity radar housed in a radome externally above the gun barrel for measuring the muzzle velocity of the departing projectiles for fire-control purposes, usually but not necessarily with the new Bofors 57 mm 3P ammunition, the ability to instantly change ammunition types by the use of a dual-feed system, another 1,000 rounds stowed in the standby rack beneath deck, as well as an improved fire control system. The Mark 3 system can also be operated/fired manually without the FC system using a joystick and video camera (mounted on the gun). The camera is fitted as standard.

For the Visby-class corvette Bofors also developed a new optional low radar profile (also known as low radar cross-section, or RCS) stealth mounting (also known as a cupola), which allows the gun to be hidden from radar and plain sight when not in use. The stealth mount/cupola is made of carbon-fibre-reinforced polymer and has a very distinctive angular, low signature.

It has since also been adopted by a variety of nations, such as Finland and the United States. In American service, the United States Navy has designated the Mark 3 as the Mark 110 Mod 0 57mm gun. According to a BAE Systems press release dated 1 August 2005, the Mark 110 would be manufactured at the BAE Systems facility in Louisville, Kentucky. BAE Systems has been awarded a contract by General Dynamics to provide two additional Mk110 Naval Gun Systems for the Independence variant of the US Navy's (USN's) Littoral Combat Ship (LCS).

Ammunition 

Ammunition for the Bofors 57 mm gun is produced by Bofors, Sako Limited in Finland, SME Ordnance in Malaysia and Nammo in Norway.

In 2006, BAE Systems AB began to offer the Bofors 57 mm 3P all-target programmable ammunition, this allows three proximity fuzing modes as well as settings for time, impact, and armor-piercing functions. This increases the flexibility and effectiveness of the gun system, which has further reduced the reaction time of the gun and it is possible to choose ammunition mode at the moment of firing, giving it the ability to switch rapidly between surface targets, air targets, and ground targets.

In April 2015, BAE Systems unveiled a new round for the Mk 110 in the design stage called the Mk 295 Mod 1 Ordnance for Rapid Kill of Attack Craft (ORKA), made to achieve one shot kills of surface and air threats.  Answering a U.S. Navy requirement for increasing the accuracy and efficiency of naval rounds, the ORKA leverages technology BAE Systems developed for larger 127 mm and 155 mm guided rounds, using a 4-canard actuation systems to guide the round.  It is fitted with a multi-mode imaging semi-active seeker that can be guided through laser designation or autonomous targeting by downloading image of the target prior to firing; ORKA retains the 3P multiple fuzing modes.

In December 2015, the U.S. Navy revealed they were working on developing a guided 57 mm round for its Mk 110 guns on the Littoral Combat Ship and other Navy and Coast Guard ships.

On 22 August 2017 L3 Mustang Technology (part of L3Harris Technologies) announced the completion of the Critical Design Review (CDR) phase for the U.S. Navy's MK 332 Mod 0 High-Explosive, 4-Bolt Guided (HE-4G) projectile. The round was developed from the Advanced Low Cost Munitions Ordnance program. It is intended for use on the LCS and the new fast Frigate, and the US Coast Guard's Legend and Heritage class cutters.

Variants 
Bofors 57 mm SAK L/70 Mk1Baseline version from 1970. 200 rounds per minute rate of fire, water-cooled.
57 mm automatpjäs 7101 (57 mm apj 7101) – Swedish navy version with two ammunition hoists.
57 mm automatpjäs 7102 (57 mm apj 7102) – Swedish navy version with one ammunition hoist.

Bofors 57 mm SAK L/70 Mk2Improved version from 1981. 220 rounds per minute rate of fire, lighter weight, new servo system, no water-cooling.
57 mm automatpjäs 7103 (57 mm apj 7103) – Swedish navy version for the Stockholm-class corvette.
57 mm automatpjäs 7103B (57 mm apj 7103B) – Swedish navy improved version for the Göteborg-class corvette.
57 mm allmålskanon Mk2 – Post 2001 designation for the 57 mm apj 7103A and 7103B.

Bofors 57 mm SAK L/70 Mk3Improved version from 1996 based on the Mk2. Ability to use programmable ammunition.
57 mm allmålskanon Mk3 – Swedish navy stealth version for the Visby-class corvette.
57 mm allmålskanon Mk3B – Swedish navy version. 57 mm allmålskanon Mk2 modified to be able to fire Mk3 programmable ammunition.
57 mm Mark 110 Mod 0 Naval Gun System – Slightly modified Mark 3 offered for use by the United States Coast Guard in 2004 and the United States Navy in 2006. The Bofors 57 mm programmable 3P ammunition is designated as Mark 295 Mod 0 in US service.

Users

Mark 1 users 

 
 :
 Madhumati class
 Meghna class
 :
 
 
 :
 
 
 :
  (modified version of the South Korean Navy's Bae Ku class)
 
 
 Eithne class
 :
 
 Perdana class
 
 
 :
 
 :
 Sea Wolf class (Lurssen TNC 45)
 
Swedish designations:
 57 mm automatpjäs 7101 (57 mm apj 7101)
 57 mm automatpjäs 7102 (57 mm apj 7102)
Swedish usage:
 
 
 
 
 
 Prabbrorapak class (derivative of Singapore's Sea Wolf class, which was based on the Lurssen TNC 45)
 :
 Begleitpanzer 57 AIFSV prototype

Mark 2 users 

 :
 
 :
 Singa class (Lürssen FPB 57 Nav II, Fast Attack Craft - Torpedo)
Pandrong class (Lürssen FPB 57 Nav IV, Fast Attack Craft - Missile/Fast Patrol Boat)
Todak class (Lürssen FPB 57 Nav V, Fast Attack Craft - Missile/Fast Patrol Boat)
 :
 
 
Swedish designations:
 57 mm automatpjäs 7103 (57 mm apj 7103), later changed to 57 mm allmålspjäs Mk2
 57 mm automatpjäs 7103B (57 mm apj 7103B), later changed to 57 mm allmålspjäs Mk2
Swedish usage:

Mark 3 users 

 :
 
 :
  (Post HCM/FELEX Refit / 2x MK3 operational prior to Halifax Class Modernization (HCM) refit)
 :
 
 
 :
 Potsdam class
:
  (The last four ship of the class) 
:
 
 :
 
 
 Reformador class
 
 
Swedish designations:
 57 mm allmålspjäs Mk3
 57 mm allmålspjäs Mk3B
Swedish usage:
 
 :
 

 Type 31
 
US designation:
 Mk 110 57mm gun
US usage:
 Legend class
 Future Heritage class cutter

See also 
 Bofors 40 mm L/60 gun
 Bofors 40 mm Automatic Gun L/70
 Bofors 57 mm m/47 aircraft gun
 Bofors 57 mm Naval Automatic Gun L/60
 Bofors 57 mm Automatic Anti-Aircraft Gun L/60
 List of naval guns by caliber

References

External links 

 BBC article
 Bofors Defence - Naval Guns and Programmable Ammunition
 Bofors 57mm MK3 Naval Gun System
 Jane's info on Bofors 57 mm gun
 NavWeaps.Com: Bofors 57 mm/60

Video
 Mk110 (57 Mk3) Technical Firings March 14, 2002 57 mm
 BAE Systems Plc
 Discovery Channel website—Watch the Bofors 57 mm gun fires and reload!

57 mm artillery
Anti-aircraft guns of Sweden
Bofors
57 mm
Naval guns of Sweden
Naval guns of the United States
Military equipment introduced in the 1970s